Kamardar (also Romanized as Kamardār) is a village in Rezvan Rural District, Kalpush District, Meyami County, Semnan Province, Iran. At the 2006 census, its population was 139, in 27 families.

References 

Populated places in Meyami County